Aalok Shrivastav is an Indian poet, lyricist and journalist. His critically acclaimed works include Aameen (2007), a poetry collection and Afreen (2012), a story collection, both published by Rajkamal Prakashan. Aalok's works have won a number of accolades for his works, including the International Pushkin Award and Dushyant Kumar Award by Madhya Pradesh Sahitya Akademi.

Early life 
He hails from Vidisha of Madhya Pradesh, India. He was born on December 30, 1971, in the Shajapur, in Madhya Pradesh. He holds an MA in Hindi.

Career

Writing
He published his first collection of poetry, Aameen by Rajkamal Prakashan, in 2007. Aameen is a Ghazal collection explaining human values and human relationships. He won the Dushyant Kumar Award from Madhya Pradesh Sahitya Akademi for his debut poetry collection Ameen in 2009, followed by International Pushkin Award in 2011. The fourth edition of Aalok's Aameen was released by Namvar Singh and Javed Akhtar at the New Delhi World Book Fair in February 2015.

He published his second book, Aafreen, a story collection published by Rajkamal Prakashan in 2012. It was released by Chitra Mudgal and Uday Prakash in Johannesburg, South Africa in the World Hindi Conference. It was well-received by the readers and critics. Harish Naval writing for Navbharat Times, placed the book, Aafreen in the list of '13 Most Popular Books of 2013'.

He has performed poetry in various countries, including United States, England, Russia, Kuwait, Bahrain, Qatar, South Africa and the UAE. His works have also been translated into various other languages, including Russian, Gujarati, Marathi, Urdu, Maithili languages.

His literary works have been given voice by Jagjit Singh, Pankaj Udhas, Shankar Mahadevan, Sonu Nigam, Aadesh Shrivastava, Rekha Bhardwaj, Shaan, Kailash Kher, Richa Sharma, Javed Ali, Ustad Rashid Khan, Shubha Mudgal and Amitabh Bachchan.

He has written lyrics for the 2011 film, Patang, directed by Prashant Bhargava, followed by writing the lyrics for the 2014 documentary film, Can't Take This Shit Anymore and the thriller film Vodka Diaries (2018). In 2020, he also wrote songs for A.R. Rahman's musical drama film, Atkan Chatkan. He has written theme songs called Dhadak Dhadak Be Dhadak Dhadak for Agra–Lucknow Expressway and Na Jaam, Na Jhanjhat for Lucknow Metro. These songs were made for the Uttar Pradesh government and were directed by Kushal Srivastava.

He has written the song Watan for Doordarshan and Prasar Bharti, which Javed Ali sung and released by Prakash Javadekar, the Minister of Information and Broadcasting in August 2019. His poem, Mai Naye Bharat Ka Chehra Hun, which he wrote for Doordarshan, was recited by Amitabh Bachchan and was launched at the celebratory event of the 60th anniversary of Doordarshan in September 2019.

His music album Eternal was sung and composed by ghazal singer Jaswinder Singh, won the AAMA Award for the Best Album Of the Year. Aalok has also written the lyrics for Anoushka Shankar's album, Traveller (2012), released in the US and was nominated for Grammy Award. In June 2015, he released his Ghazal album, Khwaabon Ki Kahaani, sung by Pankaj Udhas. Some of his other notable music albums includes Eternal (2016) by Jaswinder Singh and Noor (2018) by Sudeep Banerjee.

Journalism 
Aalok worked with media organisations like Aaj Tak, India TV and Doordarshan for almost 15 years as a print and television journalist. He began freelancing for India Today and other newspapers in the 1990s. He started TV journalism with India TV in 2005. In 2007, he joined Aaj Tak and produced significant TV programs on religion, sports, politics. In July 2014, Srivastav joined DD National, a state-owned public TV channel, as National Channel Advisor in 2014.

Bibliography 
 As writer
 Aameen (2007) (5 editions); Rajkamal Prakashan (Poetry collection) 
  Aafreen (2012) ; Rajkamal Prakashan (Story collection) 
 As editor
 Nai Duniya Ko Salaam (Ali Sardar Jafri) (1998)
  Humkadam (Nida Fazli) (1999)

Filmography 
 As lyricist

Albums

Awards and recognition 
 He won the Dushyant Kumar Award, the Madhya Pradesh Sahitya Akademi Award in 2009 for his poetry collection, Ameen.
 In 2009, he was awarded the Hemant Memorial Poetry Award by the Hemant Foundation for his book Aameen.
 In 2011, he was awarded the International Pushkin Award by the Bharat Mitra Mandal, Moscow, Russia for his work, Aameen, which is also translated into the Russian language. The award was bestowed by poet Alexander Senkevich.
 In April 2014, Aalok was honoured with the International Hindi Award by International Hindi Association for his contribution to Hindi Ghazal in Washington, USA.
 In November 2015, Aalok Shrivastav was honoured with Hindi Ghazal Award at the House of Commons of the United Kingdom by Katha UK, a British cultural organisation.
 In May 2015, he was honoured with the 'Rashtriya Dushyant Kumar Alankaran' Award by Dushyant Kumar Smarak Pandulipi Sangrahlaya, Bhopal, for the year 2014.
 He also received the Firaq Gorakhpuri Award for poetry in 2017.
 In 2018, he was awarded the Sambhulla Sukhan Award by the Madhya Pradesh Urdu Academy, Department of Culture, Madhya Pradesh.

References

External links 
 Poetry of Aalok Shrivastav at Aaj Tak
 3 Ghazals by Aalok Shrivatav at The Lallantop
 Aalok Shrivastav's Profile at World Hindi Secretariat
 कवि, किस्सा और कविता at Amar Ujala

1971 births
Hindi-language writers
Hindi-language poets
Indian lyricists
Poets from Madhya Pradesh
Indian male poets
Living people
People from Shajapur
People from Vidisha
20th-century Indian male writers